Long Marton railway station was a railway station which served the village of Long Marton in Cumbria, England.

History
The station was designed by the Midland Railway company architect John Holloway Sanders and was opened along with the line in 1876 and closed on 4 May 1970, when the local passenger service over the line was withdrawn.

The main station buildings were located on the eastern, southbound, platform and were sold and converted into a private residence after closure. They currently remain in use as holiday accommodation. Both platforms have been demolished and removed.

Stationmasters

J. Moorcroft 1876 - 1900
William Hinman 1900 - ca. 1914
T. Proctor from 1920  - ????
Richard W. Powell 1931 - 1936 (formerly station master at Lazonby, also station master at Ormside and Appleby)
George Graham Hodgson 1936 - 1953 
Mr. Harper ca. 1958

Notes

References

Binns, D. (1982), The Scenic Settle & Carlisle Railway, Wyvern Publications, Skipton. 
Houghton, F.W. & Foster W.H. (1965 Second Ed) The Story Of The Settle - Carlisle Line, Advertiser Press Ltd, Huddersfield.

Disused railway stations in Cumbria
Former Midland Railway stations
Railway stations in Great Britain opened in 1876
Railway stations in Great Britain closed in 1970
Beeching closures in England
John Holloway Sanders railway stations
Long Marton